Eresiomera nancy is a butterfly in the family Lycaenidae. It is found in Cameroon, the Republic of the Congo, the Central African Republic and the Democratic Republic of the Congo.

References

Butterflies described in 1998
Poritiinae